Masqaran (also Romanized as Masqarān; also known as Mackaran and Maskarān) is a village in Ozomdel-e Shomali Rural District, in the Central District of Varzaqan County, East Azerbaijan Province, Iran. At the 2006 census, its population was 887, in 203 families.

References 

Towns and villages in Varzaqan County